Scent of Reunion: Love Duets Across Civilizations is an album by Mahsa Vahdat and Mighty Sam McClain, which was originally released in Europe by Kirkelig Kulturverksted in late 2009 and then on May 11, 2010, in North America by Valley Entertainment.

Track listing

External links
 [ Scent of Reunion: Love Duets Across Civilizations on allmusic.com]
 Scent of Reunion: Love Duets Across Civilizations on valley-entertainment.com

2010 albums
Vocal duet albums
Mighty Sam McClain albums
Valley Entertainment compilation albums